The Doves Press was a private press based in Hammersmith, London. During nearly seventeen years of operation, the Doves Press produced notable examples of twentieth-century typography. A distinguishing feature of its books was a specially-devised typeface, known variously as the Doves Roman, the Doves Press Fount of Type, or simply the Doves Type.

The Doves Press business
The Doves Press was founded by T. J. Cobden-Sanderson sometime before 1900 (when he asked Emery Walker to join him). The business was financed by Anne Cobden-Sanderson. Their partnership was dissolved in 1908 but Cobden-Sanderson continued to print.

Cobden-Sanderson commissioned the press's own typeface Doves Type which was drawn under Walker's supervision; the Doves Bindery, which he had set up in 1893, bound the books he and Walker printed. The Press produced all its books using a single size of this type, between 1900 and 1916, and is considered to have been a significant contributor to the Arts and Crafts movement. The founders were associated with William Morris and the Kelmscott Press. The capital letters of the Doves type were based on types used by Nicolas Jenson from the 1470s, and the lowercase letters were based on types used by Jacobus Rubeus. The Doves Type was similar to Morris's earlier Golden Type and, like it, cut by punchcutter Edward Prince.

The press, at No. 1, Hammersmith Terrace, was named after The Dove, an old riverside pub nearby. The Doves Press was responsible for the Doves Bible (5 vols, 1902–1904), which the Columbia Encyclopedia considered one of the best examples of its kind.

The Doves Type dispute
By 1909, on the dissolution of their partnership, Cobden-Sanderson and Walker were in a protracted and bitter dispute involving the rights to the Doves Type. As part of the partnership dissolution agreement, all rights to the Doves Type were to pass to Walker upon the death of Cobden-Sanderson. Instead of letting this happen, Cobden-Sanderson destroyed the matrices and punches on Good Friday, 21 March 1913, when he threw them into the Thames river off Hammersmith Bridge in London, a short walk from the Press.

As recorded in Cobden-Sanderson's journals, he began the destruction of the type itself three years later, beginning on 31 August 1916 at midnight, when "it seemed a suitable night, and time". He is said to have completed the task in January 1917, after 170 trips to the river, though his Journals do not mention the culmination.

Re-creating the Doves Type
The first digital revival of the Doves Type was made in 1994 by Swedish designer Torbjörn Olsson who added a new italic, and whose fonts reproduce the soft corners and imperfections of the printed characters.

In 2013, the designer Robert Green began to create a more polished digital version of the Doves type. In 2015, after searching the riverbed of the Thames near Hammersmith Bridge with help from the Port of London Authority, Green managed to recover 150 pieces of the original type, which helped him to refine the re-created typeface. Two variants of Green's re-created Doves Type, Text and Headline, are now distributed by Typespec. The Headline variant is used by the Thames Tideway Scheme for architectural lettering.

Other digital revival projects include "Mebinac" by Alan Hayward and "Thames-Capsule" by Raphaël Verona and Gaël Faure.

See also

References

Sources

Further reading
 Cable, C. (1974). The printing types of the Doves press: Their history and destruction. Library Quarterly, 44(3), 219-230.

External links
The Doves Type at Typespec official website
An Obsessive Type podcast by BBC Radio 4

Book publishing companies of the United Kingdom
Small press publishing companies
Private press movement